The Mathematical Neuroscience Prize is a prize awarded biennially since 2013 by the nonprofit organization Israel Brain Technologies (IBT). It is endowed with $100,000 for each laureate and honors researchers who have significantly advanced the understanding of the neural mechanisms of perception, behavior and thought through the application of mathematical analysis and modeling.

Laureates 
 2013 Larry Abbott (Columbia University) and Haim Sompolinsky (Hebrew University Jerusalem)
 2015 Nancy Kopell (Boston University) and Bard Ermentrout (University of Pittsburgh)
 2017 Fred Wolf (Max Planck Institute for Dynamics and Self-Organization) and Misha Tsodyks (Weizmann Institute of Science)
 2019 Naftali Tishby (Hebrew University) and John Rinzel (New York University)

See also 
 The Brain Prize
 The Kavli Prize
 The Mind & Brain Prize
 List of mathematics awards
 List of neuroscience awards

References

External links 
 Prize Programs at Israel Brain Technologies (israelbrain.org)

Awards established in 2013
Neuroscience awards
Mathematics awards